The Foudland Hills is a mountainous landform in the northeast of Aberdeenshire, Scotland and northwest of Morayshire. The Foudland Hills are a prominent feature along the northern coastal region of Aberdeenshire, and are visible from somewhat distant points such as Longman Hill to the east.

See also
 Banff Bay

References

External links
 New Statistical Account of Scotland (1945) 
 C.Michael Hogan (2008) Longman Hill, The Modern Antiquarian

Mountains and hills of Aberdeenshire
Mountains and hills of Moray